Karen Lynch (born July 25, 1967) is a New York Times and USA Today bestselling author of young adult urban fantasy novels.

Publications

Relentless series
 Relentless (December 26, 2013)
 Refuge (December 9, 2014)
 Rogue (October 27, 2015)
 Warrior (October 25, 2016)
 Haven (May 2, 2017)
 Fated (February 13, 2018)
 Hellion (January 8, 2019)

Fae Games series
 Pawn (May 26, 2020)
 Knight (January 5, 2021)
 Queen (February 22, 2022)

References

External links

 Karen Lynch at IMDB
 Q&A with USA Today bestselling author Karen Lynch
 Karen Lynch: Writing YA Paranormal That is Absolutely Addictive!
 Force Majeure Acquires Rights to Relentless YA Supernatural Bestseller Franchise

21st-century Canadian novelists
21st-century Canadian women writers
1967 births
Living people
Canadian women novelists
Canadian fantasy writers
Writers from Newfoundland and Labrador